Orobanche canescens is a species of herb in the family Orobanchaceae. Individuals can grow to 0.4 m.

Sources

References 

canescens